Bandhagen is a suburban district south of Stockholm with 6510 (2018) inhabitants. It is located in the Enskede-Årsta-Vantör borough neighboring Högdalen, Stureby and Örby.

The metro station with the same name was opened in 1954.

Progressive metal band, Opeth, formed in Bandhagen in 1989.

Sports
The following sports clubs are located in Bandhagen:

 Rågsveds IF

References

Districts of Stockholm